Rafael Elizondo (born 21 September 1954) is a Costa Rican weightlifter. He competed in the men's light heavyweight event at the 1988 Summer Olympics.

References

1954 births
Living people
Costa Rican male weightlifters
Olympic weightlifters of Costa Rica
Weightlifters at the 1988 Summer Olympics
Place of birth missing (living people)
20th-century Costa Rican people